Gastrostomobdellidae is a family of annelids belonging to the order Arhynchobdellida.

Genera:
 Gastrostomobdella Moore, 1929
 Kumabdella Richardson, 1971

References

Annelids